Wells Township may refer to places in the U.S. state of Michigan:

 Wells Township, Delta County, Michigan
 Wells Township, Marquette County, Michigan
 Wells Township, Tuscola County, Michigan

Wells may refer to
 The post office and unincorporated community in Wells Township, Delta County, Michigan, ZIP code 49894
 A former station on the Michigan Central Railroad in Arenac County, that was south of Alger, Michigan

See also 
 Wells State Park (Michigan)
 Wellston, Michigan
 Wells Township (disambiguation)

Michigan township disambiguation pages